The Nei Xue Tang Museum ("Hall of Inner Learning") (Simplified Chinese: 内学堂）is a private museum of Buddhist art in Singapore. It is the first home museum in Singapore.  

The museum was created by collector Woon Wee Teng under a program enacted by the Singapore government to allow collectors to show their collections in their own homes. Opened in 2005, the collection is located in a four-storey pre-war house built in the Peranakan style on Cantonment Road. It is Singapore's first home museum. The museum is by invitation only.

Singaporean billionaire businessman, Oei Hong Leong, houses most of his 50,000-piece collection of Buddhist artifacts at the Museum.

In 2007, Woon announced plans for a much larger museum to house more Buddhist artifacts. Oei subsequently bought the museum but decided not to expand the museum.

See also
 List of museums in Singapore
 Japanese sculpture
 Khmer sculpture
 Korean Buddhist sculpture
 Lao Buddhist sculpture
 Thai art
 Buddha images in Thailand

References

External links
Official website

Art museums and galleries in Singapore
Buddhist museums
2005 establishments in Singapore
Religious museums in Singapore
Religious organizations established in 2005